Sir Muhammad Yamin Khan (born June 1888) CIE  was a barrister-at-law, statesman and politician in the period before  the partition of India.  Khan served as a  parliamentarian and one of the senior most members of the All India Muslim League.

Muhammad Yamin Khan was a close confidant of Quaid-e-Azam. He was a member of the working committee of All India Muslim League. He also remained Deputy President of the Indian legislative Council. He also presided over the third "Kamboh Conference" held in Bareilly in 1936. Yamin Khan was prominent in raising the Indianisation debate in the Central Legislatures in which he demanded the admission of increasing numbers of Indians to the officer corps of the British Indian Army.

The British Government recognized him for his outstanding social and legal services by appointing him a Companion of the Order of the Indian Empire (CIE) in the 1931 Birthday Honours list, and knighting him in the 1936 New Year Honours list.

After the independence of Pakistan in 1947, Khan moved with his family to Karachi, Pakistan where he soon died.

Muhammad Yamin Khan was the second Kamboj member to be knighted, and also was the second Kamboj member of the Indian Parliament (M.P.). He had also been a member of the Municipal Board of Meerut since 1918 and served it as Vice-Chairman and Chairman for a long time. The Chairmanship of the Meerut Municipal Board remained for the first half century of its existence with the Nawab family of the Meerut Kambohs.

See also
Muslim Kamboh
Nawab Sir Ziauddin Ahmad
Nawab Waqar-ul-Mulk Kamboh

References

Year of death missing
Indian Knights Bachelor
Companions of the Order of the Indian Empire
Muhajir people
Pakistani barristers
Lawyers from Karachi
Politicians from Karachi
Members of the Central Legislative Assembly of India